Maríano Moreno Airport is a joint public/military airport located south of José C. Paz, a western suburb in the Greater Buenos Aires metropolitan region of Argentina. The airport is named after Argentinian patriot Mariano Moreno.

The Mariano Moreno VOR-DME (Ident: ENO) is located on the field. The Mariano Moreno non-directional beacon (Ident: Z1) is just north of the airport.

See also

Transport in Argentina
List of airports in Argentina

References

External links 
OpenStreetMap - Mariano Moreno Airport

FallingRain - Mariano Moreno Airport

Airports in Argentina
Buenos Aires Province